Centennial Stadium is a stadium located on the campus of the University of Victoria in Victoria, British Columbia, Canada. The facility was built as a 1967 Canadian Centennial project to celebrate the 100th anniversary of Canadian confederation.

The original seating capacity was 3,000. The venue was renovated and temporarily expanded to 30,000 seats to serve as the main stadium of the 1994 Commonwealth Games. After the Commonwealth Games, the temporary seats were removed, leaving 2,000 new seats opposite the main grandstand for a total of 5,000 seats.

The stadium features a 400m synthetic rubberized track surface, as well as separate areas for long jump/triple jump, high jump, pole vault, discus, hammer, shot put, and javelin. Inside the track is a natural grass field for sports such as football and soccer.

Centennial Stadium is the home of the Victoria Vikes soccer team of U Sports Canada, and Victoria Highlanders FC of League1 British Columbia. It was also used as a soccer venue for the 2002 FIFA U-19 Women's World Championship.

References

External links
 Satellite view of Centennial Stadium on Google Maps

Sports venues in Victoria, British Columbia
1994 Commonwealth Games venues
Rugby union stadiums in British Columbia
Athletics (track and field) venues in Canada
Soccer venues in British Columbia
Multi-purpose stadiums in British Columbia
Canadian Centennial
1967 establishments in British Columbia
Sports venues completed in 1967